Nakagami (written: 中上) is a Japanese surname. Notable people with the surname include:

, Japanese therapist
 (1946–1992), Japanese writer, critic and poet
 (born 1992), Japanese motorcycle racer

See also
 Nakagami District, Okinawa
 Nakagami distribution, a statistical distribution

Japanese-language surnames